Novak Djokovic defeated the defending champion Andy Murray in the final, 6–2, 3–6, 6–3, to win the men's singles tennis title at the 2016 Madrid Open. It was Djokovic's second title in Madrid and his record 29th ATP Masters 1000 title.

Seeds 
The top eight seeds receive a bye into the second round.

Draw

Finals

Top half

Section 1

Section 2

Bottom half

Section 3

Section 4

Qualifying

Seeds

Qualifiers

Lucky loser

Draw

First qualifier

Second qualifier

Third qualifier

Fourth qualifier

Fifth qualifier

Sixth qualifier

Seventh qualifier

References 
 Main Draw
 Qualifying Draw

Men's Singles